Irakli Chkheidze (born 5 January 1999) is a Georgian weightlifter competing in the 105 kg division until 2018 and 102 kg  starting in 2018 after the International Weightlifting Federation reorganized the categories).

Career

He most recently competed at the 2018 World Weightlifting Championships. He is also the 2018 Junior World Champion in the 105 kg class.

Major results

References 

1999 births
Living people
Male weightlifters from Georgia (country)
21st-century people from Georgia (country)